Svenska Serien 1912–13, part of the 1912–13 Swedish football season, was the third Svenska Serien season played. IFK Göteborg won the league ahead of runners-up Örgryte IS.

League table

References 

Print

Online

1912-13
Sweden
1